Karreh Karami (also Romanized as Karreh Karamī; also known as Karreh) is a village in Tut-e Nadeh Rural District, in the Central District of Dana County, Kohgiluyeh and Boyer-Ahmad Province, Iran. At the 2006 census, its population was 340, in 76 families.

References 

Populated places in Dana County